Runcorn Rowing Club is a rowing club in Runcorn, Cheshire based on the River Weaver. The club has access to 10km of rowable river from Weston Marsh Lock to Dutton Lock.

History
Runcorn Rowing Club was established in 1894 on land purchased from the Marquis of Cholmondeley. The club received funding in 2005 under British Rowings's 'Project Oarsome' which saw membership increase from 39 to 100 members.

Club colours
The blade colours are royal blue with two white bars; kit: royal blue with white hoops.

Facilities
The club has three boat sheds, the latest opened by Derek Twigg MP in April 2008. A new club house was constructed in 2016 funded by the Sports Council and assisted by specialists from the consortium working on the Mersey Gateway Bridge.

Honours

British champions

References

Rowing clubs in England
Runcorn
Sports clubs established in 1894
1894 establishments in England